Pecixe is an island in Guinea-Bissau. It is a coastal island belonging to the Cacheu Region and the Caió sector. Its area is 167 km2. The island has a population of 3,207 (2009 census); the largest village is Cassaca.  The language of the island is reported to be Mandjak, a language of Guinea-Bissau with over 72,000 speakers altogether.  Jeta island lies to the west. It is 3 km off the mainland, about 50 km west of the capital city Bissau.

Climate
Cassaga, the largest village on the island has a tropical savanna climate (Aw) with little to no rainfall from November to May and heavy to extremely heavy rainfall from June to October.

See also
List of islands of Guinea-Bissau

References

Atlantic islands of Guinea-Bissau
Cacheu Region